Oliver Cromwell Cox (24 August 1901 – 4 September 1974) was a Trinidadian-American sociologist noted for his early Marxian viewpoint on fascism.

Cox was born into a middle-class family in Port of Spain, Trinidad and Tobago and emigrated to the United States in 1919. He was a founding father of the world-systems perspective, an important scholar of racism and its relationship to the development and spread of global capitalism, and a member of the Chicago school of sociology In 1929 he developed poliomyelitis (polio), causing both his legs to be permanently crippled and that was when he gave up his plans to study law. He was the son of William Raphael Cox and Virginia Blake Cox.

Education

Early Education 
He attended Saint Thomas Boys' School when he was in Trinidad, where he studied Math, English, Language and more. Cox attended YMCA High school and Crane Junior College in Chicago.

University 
In 1927, he earned a Bachelor of Science degree from Northwestern University. He also attended the University of Chicago Economics Department and graduated with a master's degree in June 1932. From there, he continued at Chicago in the sociology department, where he received both his master's degree and his Ph.D. His master's degree was completed in 1932, and then six years later in 1938 he graduated with his Ph.D.

Family 
William Raphael Cox is the father of Cox and worked as a captain of a revenue schooner, and later on as a customs and excise officer. Virginia Blake Cox was the mother of Cox and his seven siblings. Cox's uncle, Reginald Vidale was the Catholic school master at St. Thomas Boys’ School. He was a prominent teacher in the local school system and was highly respected in the community. Reginald transitioned from the position of a teacher to the Inspector of schools in 1943 and later became a city councilman, an alderman, and then mayor of Port Spain. Cox has three nieces Ann V. Awon-Pantin, Esther Awon-Thomasos, and Juliet  Awon-Uibopuu/

Academia 
Cox first initiated his teaching career at Wiley College in Marshall, Texas. From there, he also lectured at Tuskegee Institute in 1944, where many thought he would "bring them prestige." Later in 1949, he moved to Missouri, where he taught at Lincoln University until March 11, 1970, where he told the president at the college, Walter Daniels, that he was retiring. Cox moved and accepted a position as a Visiting Professor in the sociology department that was encouraged by Alvin W. Rose at Wayne State University of Michigan.

Writings
Cox was a Marxist who criticized capitalism and race in Foundations of Capitalism (1959), Capitalism and American Leadership (1962), Capitalism as a System (1964) and his last, Jewish Self-Interest and Black Pluralism (1974). Perhaps Cox's most profound and influential book was Caste, Class and Race, published in 1948. Also in 1948 Cox published Race: A Study in Social Dynamics. In a scathing "Introduction" to The Black Anglo Saxons by Nathan Hare, Cox ridiculed what he regarded as a misguided approach to the study of race relations he called "The Black Bourgeoisie School" headed by E. Franklin Frazier. The title of Caste, Class and Race referred to the vigorous criticism of W. Lloyd Warner's caste conception of race in the USA.

Awards 
The Racial and Ethnic Minorities' Oliver Cromwell Cox Article Award (for Anti-Racist Scholarship) is given out annually and also The Section on Racial and Ethnic Minorities' Oliver Cromwell Cox Book Award (for Anti-Racist Scholarship). Cox was the first ever recipient of the DuBois-Johnson-Frazier Award by the American Sociological Association.

Quotes
"It is remarkable that some of the most precious rights of human welfare are attributed to the advocacy and practice of communists; and yet, in the same breath, we are asked to hate communists." Caste, Class and Race: A Study in Social Dynamics, Monthly Review Press, New York, (1959) pg. xxxiii   
"it should not be forgotten that, above all else, the slave was a worker whose labor was exploited in production for profit in a capitalist market. It is this fundamental fact which identifies the Negro problem in the United States with the problem of all workers regardless of color." ibid. pg. xxxii
"Racial antagonism is part and parcel of this class struggle, because it developed within the capitalist system as one of its fundamental traits. It may be demonstrated that racial antagonism, as we know it today, never existed in the world before about 1492; moreover, racial feeling developed concomitantly with the development of our modern social system." ibid. pg. xxx
""The capitalist State is not a spiritual product; its function, from its inception in the medieval town, has always been primarily to secure the interest of a certain class." "ibid".

Selected works
Thesis
"Factors Affecting the Marital Status of Negroes in the United States," University of Chicago (PhD, Sociology), 1938

Books
Caste, Class, and Race: A Study in Social Dynamics, 1948
Foundations of Capitalism, 1959
Capitalism as a System, 1964
Race Relations: Elements and Social Dynamics, 1976

Book Chapters
"Leadership Among Negroes in the United States," in Studies in Leadership, by A. W. Gouldner (ed.), 1950 
"Introduction," in The Black Anglo Saxons, by Nathan Hare, 1965.

Journal Articles
"Marital Status and Employment of Women," Sociology and Social Research, 25, 1940
"Employment, Education, and Marriage of Young Negro Adults," Journal of Negro Education, 10, 1941
"Lynching and Status Quo," Journal of Negro Education, 14, 1945
"Jewish Self-Interest in 'Black Pluralism'", The Sociological Quarterly, 15(2), 1974

Archival Papers
Cox's manuscript for "Capitalism as a System" is available for research in the Oliver Cromwell Cox Papers at the Walter P. Reuther Library in Detroit. http://reuther.wayne.edu/node/14325

Citations

Sources
 Biography on the African-American Registry
Oliver Cox, Caste, Class, and Race, Monthly Review Press, 1948. 
Cedric J. Robinson, "Oliver Cromwell Cox and the Historiography of the West," Cultural Critique 17 (Winter 1990/91), 5-20.
H.M. Hunter (Editor), The Sociology of Oliver C. Cox: New Perspectives (Research in Race and Ethnic Relations), JAI Press, 2000.
Christopher A. McAuley, The Mind of Oliver C. Cox, University of Notre Dame Press, 2004.
Todd Cronan, "Oliver Cromwell Cox and the Capitalist Sources of Racism," Jacobin (Sept. 5, 2020).

External links

 https://globalsocialtheory.org/thinkers/oliver-cromwell-cox/

1901 births
1974 deaths
Northwestern University alumni
University of Chicago alumni
Trinidad and Tobago sociologists
American sociologists
Lincoln University (Missouri) faculty
Wayne State University faculty
American non-fiction writers
American Marxists
20th-century American non-fiction writers
Trinidad and Tobago emigrants to the United States